Hopetown is an unincorporated community in Ross County, in the U.S. state of Ohio.

History
Hopetown was originally called Hope, and under the latter name was laid out in 1819. The community took its name from the Hope Mill, a gristmill near the original town site. A post office called Hopetown was established in 1900 and was discontinued that same year.

Wesley Chapel in Hopetown is listed on the National Register of Historic Places.

References

Unincorporated communities in Ross County, Ohio
Unincorporated communities in Ohio
1819 establishments in Ohio
Populated places established in 1819